Hold Me Up is the third studio album by American rock band Goo Goo Dolls, released on October 16, 1990, by Metal Blade Records. It marked the beginning of John Rzeznik's emergence as the band's principal lead vocalist. The album features the band's first single "There You Are," which became their first music video as well. In 2017, Loudwire listed the album as one of Metal Blade's best albums.

Track listing

Personnel
 Johnny Rzeznik - lead guitar, backing vocals, lead vocals on tracks 2, 4, 5, 13, and 14, co-lead vocals on track 8
 Robby Takac - bass guitar, backing vocals, lead vocals on tracks 1, 3, 6, 9, and 12, co-lead vocals on track 8
 George Tutuska - drums, lead vocals on track 10

Additional personnel
 Lance Diamond - lead vocals on track 7

Just the Way You Are EP
An EP featuring the studio version of the title song and three live tracks from "Hold Me Up" was released in 1991.

References

1990 albums
Metal Blade Records albums
Goo Goo Dolls albums
Punk rock albums by American artists
Power pop albums by American artists